Katherine Horan  (born 9 June 1975) is a New Zealand paralympics runner and cyclist.

Horan secured a silver medal for the Women's 200m at the 2008 Summer Paralympics for her country after two runners ahead of her tripped.

In 2012, she switched from athletics to cycling. She was selected to compete in cycling at the 2016 Summer Paralympics.

She was appointed a Member of the New Zealand Order of Merit in the 2017 New Year Honours, for services to Paralympic sport.

In March 2018, she won the silver medal in the 500m time trial (C4) event at the UCI Para-cycling Track World Championships in Rio de Janeiro.

In March 2019, she won the bronze medal in the 500m time trial (C4) event at the UCI Para-cycling Track World Championships in Apeldoorn.

References

External links 
  (archive)
 

1975 births
Living people
Paralympic silver medalists for New Zealand
Paralympic athletes of New Zealand
Athletes (track and field) at the 2008 Summer Paralympics
Cyclists at the 2016 Summer Paralympics
Paralympic cyclists of New Zealand
New Zealand female cyclists
New Zealand female sprinters
Members of the New Zealand Order of Merit
Medalists at the 2008 Summer Paralympics
Paralympic medalists in athletics (track and field)
21st-century New Zealand women